The men's tournament of Handball at the 2018 Asian Games at Jakarta, Indonesia, was held from 13 to 31 August 2018 at the POPKI Sports Hall.

Squads

Results
All times are Western Indonesia Time (UTC+07:00)

Preliminary round

Group A

Group B

Group C

Group D

Main round

Group 1

Group 2

Group 3

Classification 5th–8th

Classification 7th–8th

Classification 5th–6th

Final round

Semifinals

Bronze medal match

Gold medal match

Final standing

References

External links
Handball at the 2018 Asian Games – Men's tournament

Men